The men's 400 metres event at the 1978 Commonwealth Games was held on 6 and 7 August at the Commonwealth Stadium in Edmonton, Alberta, Canada.

Medalists

Results

Heats
Held on 6 August

Qualification: First 5 in each heat (Q) and the next 2 fastest (q) qualify for the quarterfinals.

Quarterfinals
Held on 6 August

Qualification: First 3 in each heat (Q) and the next 4 fastest (q) qualify for the semifinals.

Semifinals
Held on 7 August

Qualification: First 4 in each semifinal (Q) qualify directly for the final.

Final
Held on 7 August

References

Heats & Quarterfinals results (The Canberra Times)
Semifinals & Final results (The Canberra Times)
Australian results

Athletics at the 1978 Commonwealth Games
1978